is an underground metro station located in Tempaku-ku, Nagoya, Aichi Prefecture, Japan operated by the Nagoya Municipal Subway's Sakura-dōri Line. It is located 14.9 kilometers from the terminus of the Sakura-dōri Line at Nakamura Kuyakusho Station.

History
Nonami Station was opened on 30 March 1994. The surrounding area is known as Nonami.

Lines

 (Station number: S17)

Layout
Nonami Station has a single underground island platform with platform screen doors.

Platforms

Former layout

External links
 Nonami Station official web site

References

Railway stations in Japan opened in 1994
Railway stations in Aichi Prefecture